5143 Heracles, provisional designation , is a highly eccentric, rare-type asteroid and synchronous binary system, classified as near-Earth object of the Apollo group, approximately 4.8 kilometers in diameter. The asteroid was discovered on 7 November 1991, by American astronomer Carolyn Shoemaker at Palomar Observatory in California, United States. It is named for the Greek divine hero Heracles.

Classification and orbit 

Heracles orbits the Sun in the inner main-belt at a distance of 0.4–3.2 AU once every 2 years and 6 months (907 days). Its orbit has an eccentricity of 0.77 and an inclination of 9° with respect to the ecliptic. The first precovery was taken at Palomar during the Digitized Sky Survey in 1953, extending the body's observation arc by 38 years prior to its official discovery observation.

Due to its high eccentricity, Heracles is also a Mercury-grazer and a Mars-crosser.

Physical characteristics

Spectral type 

In the SMASS taxonomy, Heracles is a rare O-type asteroid, which have spectra similar to those of stony chondritic meteorites of the L6 and LL6 type. However, it has also been characterized as a carbonaceous C-type, as well as a stony Sk and Q-type asteroid.

Lightcurves 

A large number of rotational lightcurves of Heracles were obtained from photometric observations between 2006 and 2016. Best rated lightcurves gave a rotation period between 2.7051 and 2.7065 hours with a brightness variation of 0.05 to 0.20 magnitude.

Diameters 

According to the surveys carried out by the Spitzer Space Telescope, the Japanese Akari satellite, and NASA's Wide-field Infrared Survey Explorer with its subsequent NEOWISE mission, the asteroid measures between 3.26 and 4.843 kilometers in diameter, and its surface has an albedo between 0.20 and 0.24. The Collaborative Asteroid Lightcurve Link adopts the results from Petr Pravec's revised WISE data, that is, an albedo of 0.1481 and a diameter of 4.83 kilometers with an absolute magnitude of 14.27.

Binary system 

On 12 July 2012, it was announced that Heracles is an assumed synchronous binary asteroid with a minor-planet moon orbiting its primary in a retrograde motion approximately every 16 hours. The companion was discovered in December 2011, by a team of astronomers using radar observations from Arecibo Observatory in Puerto Rico, following months of intensive photometric lightcurve observations (see above). It was designated .

A longer orbital period of 40–57 hours cannot be excluded, which would then no-longer be a synchronous system.

Follow-up observations in 2016 confirmed an orbital period of 17 hours for the asteroid moon.

Naming 

This minor planet was named after Heracles, the divine gatekeeper of the Olympus and one of the greatest heroes in Greek mythology, known for his strength and his Twelve Labors. In the Roman adaptation, Heracles is known as Hercules. The approved naming citation was published by the Minor Planet Center on 14 July 1992.

Notes

References

External links 
 (5143) Heracles at johnstonsarchive, datasheet, Robert Johnston
 Asteroids with Satellites, Robert Johnston, johnstonsarchive.net
 Asteroid Lightcurve Database (LCDB), query form (info )
 Dictionary of Minor Planet Names, Google books
 Asteroids and comets rotation curves, CdR – Observatoire de Genève, Raoul Behrend
 
 
 

005143
Discoveries by Carolyn S. Shoemaker
Named minor planets
005143
005143
19911107